Israel Tennis Centers ("ITC"; Hebrew: המרכז לטניס בישראל) is the largest social service agency for children in Israel, serving more than a half million children and their families since its first center opened in Ramat Hasharon in 1976. With 16 centers across Israel, primarily in underprivileged communities, the not-for-profit Centers use tennis to promote the social, physical, and psychological well being of their students (through other programs such as their Life Skills program).  Another of its goals is the development of coaches (such as Oded Yaakov), and building and maintaining courts and facilities at the highest levels.

The ITC is the physical home of the Israel Children's Centers, Israel's largest social service agency for children. The Israel Children's Centers serve 10,000 children every week through a variety of programs that address development and social needs, including coexistence programs for Arab and Jewish children and customized programs for a variety of disabilities.

The ITC has to date produced the following top-30 players:  Andy Ram (career-high doubles ranking of No. 5); Yoni Erlich (doubles ranking of No. 5); Shahar Pe'er (doubles ranking of No. 14 and singles ranking of No. 11);  Anna Smashnova (singles ranking of No. 15); Amos Mansdorf (singles ranking of No. 18); Shlomo Glickstein (singles ranking of No. 22 in 1982; No. 28 in doubles); Dudi Sela (singles ranking of No. 29 in 2009), and Harel Levy (singles ranking of No. 30 in 2001).

History
In 1974, at a time when tennis in Israel was a sport played primarily by tourists as beach hotels, Dr. Ian Froman, Freddie Krivine, Joseph D. Shane, Harold Landesberg, Rubin Josephs, and Dr. William H. Lippy began fundraising efforts to launch tennis as a sport in Israel and to build a National Tennis Center on an old strawberry patch in Ramat HaSharon given to the ITC by the government.  On April 25, 1976, Leah Rabin cut the ribbon to the Center, and 250 children signed up to participate. Canadian pioneers of the Centers included Joseph Frieberg, Gerry Goldberg, Ralph Halbert, and Harold Green.   Their fundraising efforts laid the financial foundation for Canada Stadium, where the Davis Cup and Fed Cup were hosted in Israel until 2009, and the construction and maintenance of the centers, as well as provision of equipment to the children, were funded without any government assistance.

By 2008, about 350,000 Jewish, Christian, and Moslem Israeli children had gone through the seven complexes funded by the ITC, and 1951 Wimbledon champion Dick Savitt was overseeing the coaching techniques.  Anna Smashnova moved to Israel with her family in 1990, aged 15, and trained at the ITC; the next year she won the French Open girls title, and in 2002 she reached a career-high ranking of No. 15.  In 1991 the ATP donated $5,000 to the ITC, and Argentine tennis player Martín Jaite, who is Jewish, donated $3,000.  In 1995, Israeli former Davis Cup player and national champion Gilad Bloom, who was world champion in the under-12 age group, became senior coach role with the ITC.

Thirty years after the centers were begun, in 2006 the first ITC product won a Wimbledon title, as Andy Ram won the 2006 Wimbledon Mixed Doubles title. He had learned his tennis at the ITC's Jerusalem Tennis Center, and Yoni Erlich, his men's doubles partner, had learned his tennis at the Haifa Tennis Center.  "I can only find words of esteem for the Israel Tennis Center for their support and help", Ram said after his success.

In 2007, Issy Kramer, Honorary President of the Israel Water Polo Association (IWPA), indicated that he would like to replicate what the ITC has achieved, by building centers throughout Israel, particularly in poorer neighborhoods and development towns.  "Swimming, like tennis, should not have to be an elitist sport", he said.

Notable alumni

Andy Ram (career-high singles ranking of # 187 in 2002, # 5 in doubles)
Yoni Erlich (career-high singles ranking of # 292, # 5 in doubles)
Shahar Pe'er (career-high singles ranking of # 11 in 2011; # 14 in doubles)
Anna Smashnova (career-high singles ranking of # 15 in 2003)
Amos Mansdorf (career-high singles ranking of # 18 in 1987; # 67 in doubles)
Shlomo Glickstein (career-high singles ranking of # 22 in 1982; # 28 in doubles)
Dudi Sela (career-high singles ranking of # 29 in 2009)
Harel Levy (career-high singles ranking of # 30 in 2001)
Shahar Perkiss (career-high singles ranking of # 53 in 1985)
Gilad Bloom (career-high singles ranking of # 61 in 1990; # 62 in doubles)
Eyal Ran (career-high singles ranking of # 138 in 1997, # 71 in doubles)
Tzipora Obziler (career-high singles ranking of # 75 in 2007)
Amir Hadad (career-high singles ranking of # 180 in 2003, # 87 in doubles)
Noam Okun (career-high singles ranking of # 95 in 2002)
Noam Behr (career-high singles ranking of # 127 in 2001, # 109 in doubles)
Hila Rosen (career-high singles ranking of # 138 in 1999)
Ilana Berger (career-high singles ranking of # 149 in 1992)
Oren Motevassel (career-high singles ranking of # 161 in 1997)
Yevgenia Savransky (career-high singles ranking of # 172 2006)

See also
Sports in Israel

References

External links
, ITC Site, English
Israel Children's Centers, American fundraising arm of ITC
Israel Children's Centres, Canadian fundraising arm of ITC
The Decade of an Impossible Dream: The story of the Israel Tennis Centers by Albert A Hutler, Leanore E Hutler, ITC, 1987, ASIN: B0007C1GAO
Twitter site for Israel Tennis and Education Centers Foundation: @ITECFoundation

Tennis in Israel
Tennis venues in Israel
Children's charities based in Israel